The 1929 Primera División season was the inaugural season of the Primera Division. It started on 10 February 1929 and finished on 23 June 1929. A total of 10 teams participated in the league.

After the failure to create a national league in 1928, that ended with the teams split into two unconcluded leagues, an agreement with the Royal Spanish Football Federation was finally reached for the creation of a national league.

Barcelona won the title after beating Real Unión in the last round and taking advantage of the loss of Real Madrid at Athletic Bilbao. Therefore, the Catalans were proclaimed the inaugural champions.

Election of teams 
After months of discussion, on 23 November 1928 the creation of a championship divided in divisions was finalized.

The first division would be joined by the six teams that won any time the Spanish Championship (Arenas, Athletic Bilbao, Barcelona, Real Madrid, Real Sociedad and Real Unión) and three teams that qualified for at least one final (Athletic Madrid, Español and Europa).

The tenth place would be decided in a tournament where only the winner would join La Liga, while the rest of the participant teams played the Segunda División with Racing Madrid.

Qualifying tournament 
Racing Santander achieved the last place in the inaugural season of La Liga after beating Sevilla in the second tie-break match.

Team information

League table

Results

Relegation play-off 
Last placed team Racing Santander faced Sevilla, winner of the 1929 Segunda División, in a two-legged play-off. Racing won 3–2 on aggregate, thus remaining in La Liga.

Top scorers 

Source:

Pichichi Trophy 
Note: This list is the alternative top scorers list provided by newspaper Diario Marca, it differs from the one above which is based on official match reports

See also 
 1929 Copa del Rey

References 
La liga top scorers 1928/29

1929
1
Spain